John Youngman Thomson (27 July 1896 – May 1980), sometimes known as Jack Thomson, was a Scottish professional footballer who made 97 appearances in the Football League for Brentford, Bristol Rovers, Plymouth Argyle, Chesterfield, Aberdare Athletic and Coventry City as a goalkeeper.

Personal life 
Thomson was brother-in-law to Bristol Rovers teammate David Steele. He served in the Royal Navy during the First World War. Thomson later emigrated with this wife to the United States and they lived in Brooklyn, where he worked as a yardman. He joined the United States Army Reserve in December 1936 and served through the Second World War. At the time of his death in May 1980, Thomson was living in Ossining, New York.

Honours 
Nuneaton Town
 Nuneaton Charity Cup: 1929–30

Career statistics

References

1896 births
Footballers from Greenock
Scottish footballers
English Football League players
Association football goalkeepers
Brentford F.C. players
Bristol Rovers F.C. players
Alloa Athletic F.C. players
Partick Thistle F.C. players
Aberaman Athletic F.C. players
Southern Football League players
Plymouth Argyle F.C. players
Chesterfield F.C. players
Coventry City F.C. players
New York Nationals (ASL) players
Nuneaton Borough F.C. players
Scottish expatriate footballers
Expatriate soccer managers in the United States
Benburb F.C. players
1980 deaths
Aberdare Athletic F.C. players
Scottish expatriate sportspeople in the United States
Scottish Football League players
Scottish football managers

United States Army personnel of World War II